Toxic is the fifth studio album by Japanese rock band the Gazette. It was released on October 5, 2011 in Japan and includes four singles: "Shiver", "Red", "Pledge", and "Vortex". The album scored number 3 on the Oricon Daily Charts and number 6 on the Oricon Weekly Charts, selling 25,412 copies in its first week.

Track listing
 "Infuse Into" – 1:23
 "Venomous Spider's Web" – 3:50
 "Sludgy Cult" – 3:14
 "Red" – 3:24
 "Suicide Circus" – 4:07
 "Shiver" – 4:11
 "My Devil On The Bed" – 3:23
 "Untitled" – 4:21
 "Pledge" – 6:05
 "Ruthless Deed" – 3:37
 "Psychopath" – 3:04
 "Vortex" – 4:05
 "Tomorrow Never Dies" – 4:08
 "Omega" – 1:37

DVD (limited edition only)
 "The Suicide Circus" Music Clip
 "The Suicide Circus" Making Clip

Notes
 The first album release to use all English names in the album.

References

External links
 PS Company Official Website
 Sony Music Entertainment Japan Official Website

2011 albums
The Gazette (band) albums